Anastassiya Andreyevna Gorodko (born 14 May 2005) is a Kazakhstani freestyle skier.

She participated at the Dual moguls at the FIS Freestyle Ski and Snowboarding World Championships 2021, winning a medal.

References

External links

Living people
2005 births
Kazakhstani female freestyle skiers
Freestyle skiers at the 2022 Winter Olympics
Olympic freestyle skiers of Kazakhstan
21st-century Kazakhstani women